Trichosalpinx ciliaris is a species of orchid found from Mexico, Belize, Central America and down to Brazil (Roraima).

References 

ciliaris
Orchids of Central America
Orchids of Belize
Orchids of Brazil
Orchids of Mexico
Flora of Roraima